Samuel ben Jacob ibn Jam or Samuel ben Jacob Jam'a (Hebrew: שמואל בן יעקב אבן ג'אמע) was rabbi of the North-African community of קאבס (Gabès?) who flourished in the 12th century. He was on intimate terms with Abraham ibn Ezra, who dedicated to him his Ḥai ben Meḳiẓ and mentioned eulogiously three of his sons — Judah, Moses, and Jacob.

Works 
Under the title Elef ha-Magen, or, perhaps, Agur (the Hebrew equivalent of his Arabic name, "Jam'"), Samuel wrote a supplement to the Aruk, of Nathan ben Jehiel. Excerpts from this supplement, which is still extant in manuscript, were published by Solomon Buber in Grätz Jubelschrift. Samuel is believed to be identical with the author of the same name whose novellæ on Sanhedrin are mentioned by Isaac ben Abba Mari of Marseilles in his Sefer ha-'Ittur.

Two Arabic works, Risalat al-Burhan fi Tadhkiyat al-Ḥaiwan, containing the laws concerning the slaughtering of animals, and Kitab al-Zahdah lil-Muta'ammilin fi Yaḳaẓat al-Mutaghaffilin, on ethics, are also credited to him.

According to L. Dukes and other scholars, Samuel was the author also of the grammatical work Reshit ha-Leḳaḥ, which is found in manuscript in the Vatican and Paris libraries, and which bears the name of Samuel ben Jacob. This, however, is denied by Steinschneider, who believes this grammar to have been written by another Samuel ben Jacob, of a later day.

References

 Jewish Encyclopedia bibliography: J.L. Rapoport, 'Erek Millin, Introduction; L. Dukes, in Ben Chananja, 1861, p. 11; idem, in Orient, Lit. xii. 350; idem, in Oẓar Neḥmad, ii. 199; S. Pinsker, Liḳḳuṭe Ḳadmoniyyot, i. 151; A. Geiger, in Z. D. M. G. xii. 145; Reifman, in Ha-Karmel, ii. 243; Halberstam, ib. iii. 215; A. Neubauer, in J. Q. R. iii. 619; Kohut, Aruch Completum, Introduction; Steinschneider, Hebr. Bibl. vi. 10, xiii. 3; idem, Die Arabische Literatur der Juden, § 105.

12th-century people of Ifriqiya
12th-century rabbis
Jews of Ifriqiya
Sephardi rabbis
Lexicographers